Dead Static Drive is a top-down driving meets survival horror video game developed and published by Reuben Games. It is planned to be released on Windows and Xbox One. The game has a "retro Americana" graphical style, and involves a road trip that takes a turn into Lovecraftian horror.

Plot 
The main character of the game goes on a road trip to reconnect with their estranged family members, traveling between towns and doing quests in each town where they can freely walk around outside their car. The player realizes that the apocalypse is happening and must fight Lovecraftian monsters and potentially stop the end of the world.

Development 
The game's creator, Mike Blackney, started development in 2014, and 6 months later, in 2015, received a $15,000 Unreal Dev Grant for the game's development. Later, he also received funding from the Australian government that enabled him to quit his job as a teacher and continue developing the game, as well as hire an artist and musician. He noted inspiration for the game from the 1981 film The Evil Dead, and horror set in the suburbs and mundane settings, and has described the game as "Grand Theft Cthulhu". Leena van Deventer came onto the project in 2019, as Creative Producer and Writer.

Reception 
Stephanie Chan of VentureBeat called the game "stylish but also evocative". Adam Smith of Rock, Paper, Shotgun called the graphics "lovely" and the monsters "refreshingly untentacled", commenting that the game could use some folklore that is not just Lovecraft.

References 

Upcoming video games
Survival video games
Horror video games
Racing video games
Indie video games
Windows games
Video games developed in Australia
Video games set in the United States
Xbox One games
Unreal Engine games
Action-adventure games
Single-player video games